Khayyam Metro Station is a station in Tehran Metro Line 1. It is located in Khayyam Street. It is between Meydan-e Mohammadiyeh Metro Station and Panzdah-e-Khordad Metro Station. The station provides access to Tehran Grand Bazar.

References

Tehran Metro stations